Nothofagus menziesii, commonly known as silver beech, is a tree of the southern beech family endemic to New Zealand. Its common name probably comes from the fact that its bark is whitish in colour, particularly in younger specimens. It is found from Thames southwards in the North Island (except Mount Taranaki/Egmont), and throughout the South Island. Silver beech is a forest tree up to 30 m tall. The trunk, which is often buttressed, may be up to 2 m in diameter. The leaves are small, thick and almost round in shape, 6 to 15 mm long and 5 to 15 mm wide with rounded teeth which usually occur in pairs, 1 or 2 hair fringed domatia are found on the underside of each leaf. Its Māori name is tawhai. It grows from low altitudes to the mountains. Nothofagus menziesii was proposed to be renamed Lophozonia menziesii in 2013.

Distribution
Alongside mountain beech (Nothofagus solandri var. cliffortioides), silver beech is the most widely distributed beech taxon in New Zealand. Predominantly found in cold wet forests from the Bay of Plenty to the bottom of the South Island. No beeches are present on Stewart Island. In the South Island its geographical range extends from sea level to the treeline, while in the North Island they are restricted mainly to montane and subalpine forests on ranges and central volcanoes. Silver beech forests generally dominate wetter regions in the South Island within Fiordland and Southland.

Silver beech trees typically dominate other species of beech in increasingly wet and cold environments, due to its competitive advantage in greater tolerance of low soil nutrients, greater shade tolerance and lower thermal optimum for photosynthesis. Extensive pure silver beech forests are commonly found in high altitude environments between 500 m and the timberline, but also exist in valley floors, especially in inland valleys where atmospheric and soil moisture is high.

Throughout the New Zealand landscape there are areas that have suitable soils and conditions, yet lack the presence of southern beech trees and given the common term of ‘beech gap’. There are several hypotheses as to why these gaps occur, including glaciation, volcanic activity and drought.  Also theorised that it might be caused due to drought from Māori lighting forest fires pre-European settlement. The most significant example of a beech gap is located in central Westland in the South Island, two areas of high endemicity (Otago-Southland, and northwest Nelson) are separated by low diversity.

Cultivation and uses
The wood is hard and is used for furniture. It is not durable outdoors. The bark contains a black dye and tannin which is used for tanning leather.

References

External links
 University of Waikato: Nothofagus
 New Zealand School of Forestry: Nothofagus menziesii photo

Nothofagaceae
Endemic flora of New Zealand
Trees of New Zealand
Garden plants of New Zealand
Ornamental trees